Salma Samar Damluji (born in Beirut in 1954), is an Iraqi British architect, professor and author. She graduated from the AA School of Architecture in 1977 and from the Royal College of Art in London in 1987, where she did her doctorate. She worked with the Egyptian architect Hassan Fathy in Cairo, in 1975-6 and in 1984–5. She was appointed architectural advisor to the UAE minister Shaykh Sultan Bin Zayed Al Nahyan in 2001–2004 on The Shaykh Zayed Grand Mosque project and other projects in Abu Dhabi. In 2008, she established with colleagues in Yemen, the Daw'an Mud Brick Architecture Foundation in Hadramut (Yemen) and has been working there on earth construction and rehabilitation projects.

Career
Damluji's involvement with the architecture of Yemen began after a working visit for the UNESCWA in 1981. Her projects there include, ‘Aynat Mosque: Masjid al Faqih (2008-11), Masna‘at ‘Urah, Daw‘an (2008-12), Husn Qarn Majid, Daw‘an (2012-14), ‘Umar Ba Wazir Mosque, Wadi Sah (2008-10) and more recently (2017-19) the post-war rehabilitation of the Shibam Gateway, and the reconstruction of al-Habib Hamad bin Salih Dome’ Bin Isma‘il Domes, Shaklanza Mosque in Shihr and Shaykh Ya‘qub Dome in Mukalla These projects were funded by the Prince Claus Fund of the Netherlands and the Cultural Protection Fund of the British Council, United Kingdom.

In 2014, Damluji was the first woman architect invited to give the Leçon Inaugurale at the École de Chaillot in Paris, the tenth in the series. This was published in The Other Architecture: Geometry, Earth and the Vernacular, (Paris, 2015) and formed an overview of her work and research.

She was elected Member of the Académie d’Architecture in Paris in 2017, and awarded the Académie d’Architecture's Restoration Award (silver medal) in 2015. In 2012 she received The Global Award for Sustainable Architecture in 2012, from the Cité d'architecture & du Patrimoine and the Locus Foundation.

In 2013, she was appointed to the Mu‘allim Awad Binaldin Chair for Professor of Architecture in the Islamic World, at the American University of Beirut. Damluji was senior tutor at the Architectural Association (AA) Graduate School and at the Royal College of Art (RCA) in London (UK). She has several titles published on earth and vernacular architecture of the Arab region. Her publications include Hassan Fathy: Earth & Utopia (2018), The Architecture of Yemen (2007) and The Architecture of Oman (1998).  A new edition of The Architecture of Yemen and its Reconstruction will be published in 2020. She has curated several exhibitions on her work in London (at the RCA and RIBA), in Paris, Venice and in Madrid.

Publications

Books 
 Hassan Fathy: Earth & Utopia, (Laurence King Publishing, London 2018)
 The Other Architecture: Geometry, Earth and Vernacular (Leçon Inaugurale de l’École de Chaillot), Paris 2015, French and English. (Short listed by the Académie d’Architecture for the Prix du Livre d’Architecture in November 2015)
 Al Diwan Al Amiri, Doha, Qatar, Laurence King Publishing, London 2013
 Earth Architecture, Architectural Landmarks Wadi Hadramut & Daw‘an, Earth Architecture Conference Say’un- February 2011, Beirut 2011
 Editor. The Sheikh Zayed Al Nahayan Mosque Abu Dhabi: Italian Excellence in The UAE, Fantini Mosaici, Milano 2009
 The Architecture of Yemen From Yafi’ to Hadramut, Laurence King Publishing, London 2007
 The Sultan Qaboos Grand Mosque, Apex Publishing, Muscat 2007
 The Architecture of the UAE, Garnet Publishing, Reading 2006
 The Architecture of Oman, Reading 1998
 Editor. The Architecture of the Prophet's Holy Mosque Madinah, London 1998
 Editor. The Architecture of the Holy Mosque Makkah, London 1998
 Zillij The Art of Moroccan Ceramics, with John Hedgecoe; Reading 1992 (French Edition 1993)
 General Editor, Islamic Art and Architecture, The System of Geometric Design Issam El Said; Tarek El Bouri & Keith Critchlow, Reading 1993
 The Valley of Mud Brick Architecture Shibam, Tarim and Wadi Hadramut, Reading 1992 (Arabic Edition, Beirut 1996)
 A Yemen Reality; Architecture Sculptured in Mud and Stone, Reading 1991
 Editor. The Visual Diary of an Arab Architect, Maath Alousi, Beirut & London 1983

Book chapters 
 http://www.gallimard.fr/Catalogue/GALLIMARD/Alternatives/Architecture-Alternatives/Sustainable-design-8 ‘Ammar Khammash Portrait' in Sustainable Design 8: Towards a new Ethics for Architecture and the City, Contal, Marie-Hélène and Revedin, Jana, Architecture - Alternatives Gallimard Editions, Paris, 2020 (pp.124-131).
 ‘A Mosque & Saint Domes in Wadi Sah: Hadramut (YEMEN)’, in earth construction & tradition vol 2 Ed. Hubert Feiglstorfer, IVA-ICRA (Institute for Comparative Research on Architecture) Vienna University of Technology, Vienna, 2018 (pp. 313–337).
 ‘Re-inventing M‘alula’ in Wave 2017 | Syria (Syria the Making of the Future + 26 workshops), Incipit (Italy), 2017
 ‘La Médina et le renouveau de la ville nomade [The Medina and nomad urban renewal]’, in La Ville Rebelle, Ed. Jana Revedin, Paris, 2015
 "Salma Samar Damluji"’ in Sustainable Design III, vers une nouvelle ´ethique pour l’architecture et la ville, Contal, Marie-Hélène and Revedin, Jana, Paris, 2014 (pp.82-95).

Articles 
 Alef Magazine Issue 6 pp.70-73, 2008
 Earth Wear: Mud Cities in Hadramut, Yemen, The Architectural Review, February 2020
 Hassan Fathy, de la vérité en Architecture; Hassan Fathy, About Truth in Architecture, Engagements, L’Architecture d’Aujourd’hui, ‘A’A 424, September 2018
 Les Architectures de Terre de Salma Samar Damluji; Salma Samar Damluji’s Earth Architecture, Générosités, espaces en plus, L’Architecture d’Aujourd’hui, ‘A’A 426, May 2018

Exhibitions 

 Iuav Architecture University of Venice Wave exhibition on Ma‘lula: ‘Construction of life size dome for Ma‘lula, models of the destroyed convents, and city’, Venice, June- July 2017
 AA XX 100 Women in Architecture in Context 1917–2017, Architectural Association, London, 7 October-9 December 2017
 Iuav Architecture University of Venice ‘Sketch for Syria’, art works, January–February 2017
 Re-Enchant the World, group exhibition of the Cité de l’Architecture et du Patrimoine, Palais du Chaillot, Paris, May–October 2014
 Consultant to the Louisiana Museum of Modern Art, Denmark for the exhibition ‘Arab Contemporary: Architecture, Culture and Identity’, Denmark, January- May 2014
 ‘ARABIA FELIX: The Architecture of Yemen’, RIBA London, November 2007- February 2008

Reviews 

 Casabella, May 2020  ‘Hassan Fathy’ by Francesco Dal Co
 November–December 2019: New Left Review  ‘A Mud-Brick Utopia’ by Owen Hatherley
 November 2018: Financial Times  ‘Best books of 2018: Architecture and design’ by Edwin Heathcote
 8 November 2018: Corriere della Sera  ‘Hassan Fathy: l’utopia continua’ by Testo Massimo di Conto
 October 2018 Wallpaper magazine  ‘The first book on the philosophy and work of Hassan Fathy’ by Harriet Thorpe
 October 2018 Architectural Digest Middle East  ‘Book Review: Hassan Fathy’s tale of Earth & Utopia’ by Jumana Abdel-Razzaq

Awards 

 Médaille de la Restauration, French Academy of Architecture, Silver Medal of The French Academy of Architecture 2015 (Paris)
 Global Award for Sustainable Architecture 2012 (Paris), The Locus Foundation

Video features 

Cool Mud Beats Concrete for Building Homes in a Hotter Africa, 2 November 2022
Daw‘an Mud Brick Architecture Foundation: Twelve years of work
‘Retelling History …’, New Canonical Histories series, London, UK, January 2019
W.A.Ve. 2018 Italian Beauty: the video of the award ceremony
Salma Samar Damluji, Daw‘an Architecture Foundation, Entrevue diffusée dans l'exposition "Réenchanter le monde: architecture, ville, transitions" présentée à la Cité de l'architecture et du patrimoine du mercredi 21 mai 2014 au lundi 6 octobre 2014
Earth Earth, with Roger Moukarzel, for Re-enchant the World Exhibition, Cité de l’Architecture & du Patrimoine, 2014
Leçon Inaugurale de l’école de Chaillot, Cité de l’Architecture et du Patrimoine, 3 March 2014
Sun Dust: Shibam with Roger Moukarzel, 2013

Daw‘an Mud Brick Architecture Foundation 
Daw‘an Mud Brick Architecture Foundation was established in 2007-8 by Salma Samar Damluji and her colleagues in Yemen, Dr Abdullah BaGhumyan and Architect Ali Ba Saad. The foundation sets up projects and seeks funding to design and construct with Hadrami builders using earth materials and techniques of Yemeni architecture.

Projects completed 
Masna‘at ‘Urah  Location: Wadi Daw‘an Date: 2006 – 2013
‘Aynat Mosque: Masjid al Faqih  Location: ‘Aynat- Wadi Hadramut Date: 2008 – 2011
‘Umar Ba Wazir Mosque Location: Ghayl ‘Umar- Sah, Wadi Hadramut Date: 2008 – 2010

Wali Domes (Saint Shrines) Location: Sah, Wadi Hadramut Date: 2008 – 2010
Husn Qarn Majid Location: Wadi Daw‘an Date: 2012 – 2014
Shibam’s Housing The BaSahi House - The BaSwatayn House Location: Shibam, Wadi Hadramut Date: 2012 – 2014
Post-War Shibam Shibam Gateway Shibam Palace Entrance Location: Shibam, Wadi Hadramut Date: 2017 – 2019
A grant was approved by the British Council, Cultural Protection Fund (CPF), for a project on ‘Post-war Reconstruction and Rehabilitation in Yemen’, directed by the CER-Net Prince Claus Fund. The Daw‘an Architecture Foundation was contracted to manage and implement the project in partnership with the Office of the Governor of Hadramut. The project concerns reconstructing cultural sites and landmarks in Hadramut that have been targeted in the war:

Shaykh Ya‘qub Dome Location: Al Mukallah, Hadramut Date: 2019 – 2020

Shaklanza Mosque Location: Al Shihr, Hadramut Date: 2019 – 2020
Al Habib Hamad Bin Salih Domes Location: Al Shihr, Hadramut Date: 2019 – 2020
Bin Isma‘il Domes Location: Al Shihr, Hadramut Date: 2019 – 2020

References 

British architects
British writers
British women architects
British women writers
1954 births
Living people